Unqualified, glyceraldehyde-3-phosphate dehydrogenase usually refers to the enzyme  glyceraldehyde-3-phosphate dehydrogenase (EC 1.2.1.12).

Glyceraldehyde-3-phosphate dehydrogenase may also refer to:

 glyceraldehyde-3-phosphate dehydrogenase (phosphorylating) (EC 1.2.1.12)
 glyceraldehyde-3-phosphate dehydrogenase (NADP+) (phosphorylating) (EC 1.2.1.13)
 glyceraldehyde-3-phosphate dehydrogenase (NAD(P)+) (EC 1.2.1.59)
 glyceraldehyde-3-phosphate dehydrogenase (NADP+) (EC 1.2.1.9)
 glyceraldehyde-3-phosphate dehydrogenase (ferredoxin) (EC 1.2.7.6)
 GAPDHS (EC 1.2.1.12)